Detection of peroxide gives the initial evidence of rancidity in unsaturated fats and oils. Other methods are available, but peroxide value is the most widely used. It gives a measure of the extent to which an oil sample has undergone primary oxidation, extent of secondary oxidation may be determined from p-anisidine test.

The double bonds found in fats and oils play a role in autoxidation. Oils with a high degree of unsaturation are most susceptible to autoxidation. The best test for autoxidation (oxidative rancidity) is determination of the peroxide value. Peroxides are intermediates in the autoxidation reaction.

Autoxidation is a free radical reaction involving oxygen that leads to deterioration of fats and oils which form off-flavours and off-odours. Peroxide value, concentration of peroxide in an oil or fat, is useful for assessing the extent to which spoilage has advanced.

Definition 
	
The peroxide value is defined as the amount of peroxide oxygen per 1 kilogram of fat or oil. Traditionally this was expressed in units of milliequivalents, although in SI units the appropriate option would be in millimoles per kilogram (N.B. 1 milliequivalents = 0.5 millimole; because 1 mEq of O2 =1 mmol/2=0.5 mmol of O2, where 2 is valence).  The unit of milliequivalent has been commonly abbreviated as mequiv or even as meq.

Method
The peroxide value is determined by measuring the amount of iodine which is formed by the reaction of peroxides (formed in fat or oil) with iodide ion.

2 I- + H2O + R-OOH  ->  R-OH + 2 OH- + I2

The base produced in this reaction is taken up by the excess of acetic acid present. The iodine liberated is titrated with sodium thiosulphate.

2S2O3^2- + I2 ->  S4O6^2- + 2 I-

The acidic conditions (excess acetic acid) prevents formation of hypoiodite (analogous to hypochlorite), which would interfere with the reaction.

The indicator used in this reaction is a starch solution where amylose forms a blue to black solution with iodine and is colourless where iodine is titrated.

A precaution that should be observed is to add the starch indicator solution only near the end point (the end point is near when fading of the yellowish iodine colour occurs) because at high iodine concentration starch is decomposed to products whose indicator properties are not entirely reversible.

Taste

Peroxide values of fresh oils are less than 10 milliequivalents/kg; when the peroxide value is between 30* and 40 milliequivalents/kg, a rancid taste is noticeable.

See also-related test methods
 Acid value
 Amine value
 Bromine number
 Epoxy value
 Hydroxyl value
 Iodine value
 Saponification value

References 

Food safety
Flavors